Trans Sarbagita is a bus rapid transit (BRT) system in Denpasar, Bali, Indonesia. The system began its operations on 18 August 2011. It was designed to rebuild Bali's public transport system. As of 2014, the buses carried 5,000 passengers per day with 25 Buses in operation. The buses run in 2 routes, the first is Batubulan-Nusa Dua vv and Denpasar Kota-Garuda Wisnu Kencana vv. The ticket prices are 3,500 IDR for adults and 2,500 IDR for students. in 2015 Trans Sarbagita launched two new routes, Tabanan-Mengwi-Bandara and Mahendradata-Sanur-Lebih.

Routes 

In terminus like batubulan, passenger can switch to another buses or minibuses to other destinations such as Bangli, Kintamani, Karangasem, Klungkung

Feeder 

Trans Sarbagita has seven feeder services that continue on the narrow roads and connect to the main bus corridors. There are three services in the Badung Regency, and four services in Denpasar city. The ticket prices are 3,000 IDR for adults and 2,000 IDR for students in C1, F1 and F2. 8,000 IDR for adults and 2,000 IDR for students in TP 01, TP 02, TP 03 and TP 04. In 2015, the feeder services in Denpasar city is suspended due to low ridership.

Minibus (Non Feeder) Denpasar 

Angkot services other than feeder services is also exist in Denpasar City. they operated and owned mostly by driver itself and the service is not integrated to Trans Sarbagita since the feeder service is suspended.

Fleet

References 

Bali
2011 establishments in Indonesia
Transport in Bali